Jeff Leka is an American racing driver who won the NASCAR Weekly Series national championship in 1999.

Driving a dirt Modified owned by Jim and John Livingston, Leka won 15 of the 18 races that he entered at Macon Speedway in Illinois.

References 

NASCAR drivers
American racing drivers
Living people
Year of birth missing (living people)
Place of birth missing (living people)